Athani is a village in Nedumbasery Panchayat in Aluva Taluk. Athani is between Angamaly and Aluva in Eranakulam district in the Indian state of Kerala.

Kerala Agro Machinery Corporation Limited is situated at Athani. Kerala Ayurveda Limited have an office, factory and herb garden there. Kerala Judicial Academy is working at Athani from 2016.

Geography 
This village is situated in the National Highway 544. Cochin International Airport road starts from there. Athani is situated 6 km from Angamaly, 5 km away from Cochin International Airport, 8.2 km away from Aluva Town and 2.1 km away from Chengamand.

Nearby places are given below.

Chengamanad
Kaprassery
Karakkattukunnu
Mekkad
Nedumbassery
Neduvannoor
Cheriya Vappalassery
Parambayam
Kottai

Education 
St Francis Assisi School and Mar Athanasius Higher Secondary School are the local educational institutions.

Religion

Temples

 Veerahanuman Kovil
 Nedumbassery Sree DurgaDevi Temple
 Mukundapuram Sree Maha Vishnu Temple

Churches

 St. Antony's Latin Catholic Church
 St Francis Assisi Church
 St. George Jacobite Syrian Church
 St. Mary's Chapel
 The Pentecostal Mission Church
 Holy Family Convent Daughters Of Nazareth

References

Villages in Ernakulam district